Tom Kiradjieff and John Kiradjieff were Bulgarian American restaurateurs, Macedonian immigrants, credited for their creation of a regional specialty dish known as the Cincinnati chili.

History 
The brothers were born in the town of Hrupishta, then in the Ottoman Empire, by Bulgarian parents. The town was annexed during the Balkan Wars (1912-1913) by Greece. The partition of the Ottoman lands of the region of Macedonia between the Balkan nation-states resulted in the fact, that some of the Slavic speakers of Ottoman Macedonia emigrated to Bulgaria, or left the area. 

Athanas (Tom) was born in 1892. During the First World War, he was a soldier in the Bulgarian Army. In 1917 he was dismissed and moved to the Bulgarian capital Sofia, where he worked for a time as an accountant. His little brother Ivan (John) born in 1895 had served also some time with the Bulgarian army. In 1921 both emigrated to the United States. 

They settled initially in New York, but after selling hot dogs there for some time, the brothers followed their big brother Argir (Argie) to Cincinnati. Born in 1880, he was a cashier of the Bulgarian Exarchate Church-School Board in Hrupishta. Argie had settled in Cincinnati by 1918, where he opened a grocery store. In Cincinnati the brothers began to develop their own business. Tom got a job as a bank clerk and worked at night, cooking chili for the customers in his brother's place. It was at this time that Tom invented the regional specialty known as Cincinnati chili. 

In 1922 they opened a hot dog stand located next to a burlesque theater called the Empress, which they named their business after. Tom and John returned to Bulgaria to find wives, while Argir went to his homeland for this purpose. Argir stayed there for several years, and when he came back, his two brothers were well established and provided him a job as a cashier. According to the journalist Vasil Stefanov, in 1933 the Kiradjieff brothers were among the most successful Bulgarians in the city, owners of a large and modern restaurant in the city center. 

Argir's wife did not adapt to America, and they moved back to Macedonia in the 1940s. The Empress Chili grew to become a local chain. In 1959, the Kiradjieffs of Empress Chili, announced they be the first to come up with a new design for drive in, car-service. The last man who ran the family business was Tom's son Assen (Joe) Kiradjieff. Since the late 1950s, when his father's health sharply declined, Joe operated the Empress Chili. Tom died in 1960, while John had died in 1953. Later the Empress chain had a single surviving outlet. In 2009, 79-year-old Joe retired and sold the Empress Chili.

Gallery

See also 
 Slavic speakers of Greek Macedonia
 Macedonian Bulgarians
 Macedonian Americans

Notes

Footnotes

External link
 Veterans History Project - 2019 interview with Joe Kiradjieff. Cincinnati & Hamilton County Public Library.

People from Argos Orestiko
People from Salonica vilayet
Macedonian Bulgarians
Bulgarian emigrants to the United States
Bulgarians from Aegean Macedonia
Macedonian emigrants
American people of Macedonian descent
Macedonian businesspeople